The 1. Rugby Bundesliga is the top level of domestic club rugby union competition in Austria.

History
The competition was first contested in 1992, with RC Wien as the first champions.

For the 1993/1994 season, the four strongest Austrian teams competed with two Slovenian teams in the Alpenliga (Alps League), which replaced the Bundesliga. This arrangement was repeated in the 1994/1995 season, with three Austrian teams playing against two Slovenian teams and RK Sisak from Croatia.

The 1995/1996 season was the first time 1. and 2. Bundesligen were played, but reverted to a single league for all clubs in 1996/1997 because of the progress made by the newer clubs. The difference in playing standards were however too large, and the following two seasons saw three of the Viennese clubs - RC Wien, Vienna Celtic, and RC Lycee - take on three Czech clubs in the Austro-Moravian League. This meant that the remaining clubs battled it out for the Bundesliga.

Current teams
2019-20 season

Results
The scores in blue are links to accounts of finals on the site of the Austrian Rugby Federation (ÖRV) - in German

Performance by club

Regions
The following table lists the Austrian rugby champions by region.

See also
Rugby union in Austria

References

External links
Official website

Austria
Rugby union in Austria
Professional sports leagues in Austria